Memorial Park, a municipal park in Houston, Texas, is one of the largest urban parks in the United States. Opened  in 1924, the park covers approximately  mostly inside the 610 Loop, across from the neighborhood of Memorial. Memorial Drive runs through the park, heading east to downtown Houston and west to the 610 Loop. A small portion of land west of the 610 Loop bordered by Woodway Drive and Buffalo Bayou is also part of the park. I-10/U.S. 90 borders the park to the north. The park was originally designed by landscape architects Hare & Hare of Kansas City, Missouri.  In 2016, the operation of the park was transitioned from the Houston Parks and Recreation Department to the Memorial Park Conservancy, a private non-profit organization with a mission to "restore, preserve and enhance Memorial Park."

History
From 1917 to 1923, the land where the park currently exists was the site of Camp Logan, a U.S. Army training camp named after Illinois U.S. Senator and Civil War General John A. Logan. During World War I, the training camp was located on the far west boundaries of Houston. After the war in early 1924, Will and Mike Hogg, purchased  of former Camp Logan land and sold the area to the city at cost. In May 1924, the City of Houston took ownership of the land to be used as a "memorial" park, dedicated to the memory of soldiers who lost their lives in the war. The park is adjacent to the Camp Logan, Crestwood, and Rice Military neighborhoods.

On April 25, 2018, philanthropists Rich and Nancy Kinder through their foundation, the Kinder Foundation, pledged $70 million to the Memorial Park Conservancy to accelerate redevelopment and restoration work.

Facilities
The park includes the 18-hole Memorial Park Golf Course, Texas's top-rated municipal golf course. Formerly the site of a nine-hole course launched in 1912, it was completely redesigned by John Bredemus and opened  in 1936. The course rating is 75.0 with a slope rating of 130 from its back tees. The course will host the tournament again in the 2021 season (October 2020). The ashes of tour professional Dave Marr  were spread over the course, as it was where the winner of the 1965 PGA Championship learned to play the game.

The park also has facilities for tennis, softball, swimming, track, croquet, volleyball, skating, cycling, and a running course. Very popular with Houston joggers, the running course is the Seymour Lieberman Exercise Trail, a crushed granite pathway that sees almost 3 million visits annually. For joggers used to running in the lush green surroundings it is disappointing to see the shrinkage in the number of trees as a result of drought and hurricanes.

On the south side of Memorial Drive, there are miles of multi-use trails through the woods, a 'picnic' loop which is used heavily by road cyclists, softball fields, sand volleyball courts and a field for playing rugby or soccer. The softball fields are the home venue for the Texas Southern Tigers softball team.

The Houston Arboretum and Nature Center, an arboretum and botanical garden, sits on  within the park. The Nature Center building was constructed in 1967.

Becks Prime has a location on the grounds of the Memorial Park golf course, as does Smoothie King The restaurant is within the clubhouse, overlooking the golf course.

See also

The Houston riot of 1917 began in Camp Logan which later became Memorial Park.

References

External links

 Memorial Park Conservancy
 City of Houston, Memorial Park
 Houston Arboretum and Nature Center
 Memorial Park Golf Course

Parks in Houston
Neighborhoods in Houston
Golf clubs and courses in Texas
Softball venues in Houston
World War I memorials in the United States
1924 establishments in Texas